Sebastian "Seb" Priaulx (born 18 January 2001) is a British racing driver who competes for Dempsey-Proton Racing in the FIA World Endurance Championship.

Career

Early career
Priaulx was introduced to motorsports at a karting track near Circuit de Nevers Magny-Cours while his father, Andy, was testing there. At the age of 8, he began competing in karts, before progressing to cars in the Ginetta Junior Winter Series at the end of 2015. He cited his early aspirations as reaching Formula 1, but began in the Ginetta ladder in lieu of Formula 4 due to its value for money. 

In 2016, he graduated to the Ginetta Junior Championship at large, driving for JHR Developments. He scored his first victory in the series in September at Silverstone, adding five additional podiums over the course of the season en route to a 7th-place points finish. In the series' season-ending Winter Series, Priaulx scored two race victories at Brands Hatch, scoring the title. Priaulx returned to the championship in 2017, supported by sponsorship from 1st Central Insurance, and began the championship by winning on the opening weekend at Brands Hatch. He continued the season strongly, winning five consecutive races between the rounds at Thruxton and Croft, before parting ways with JHR Developments following their suspension from the series in August. For the Rockingham round, Priaulx joined HHC Motorsport, finishing the season as championship runner-up to Tom Gamble.

While competing in Ginettas, Priaulx worked at a car dealership to supplement his racing career.

Junior formula

Priaulx's brief junior formula career began in 2018, joining the TRS Arden team in the F4 British Championship. Supported by new sponsor Ravenscroft, his confidence was high entering the opening round at Brands Hatch, and he scored a fourth-place finish in his first race in the championship. In the second event of the weekend, he scored his maiden victory in the series, taken after the top two finishers on the road were penalized for a jump start. Priaulx scored just one more race victory that season, in the final race meeting at Brands Hatch, finishing 7th in the championship. This was his only season in single-seaters, and he signed a deal with Multimatic Motorsports to compete in sports car racing for 2019.

Sports car racing

GT4
Priaulx's first foray into sports car racing was the 2019 British GT Championship, joining co-driver Scott Maxwell in a Multimatic-prepared Ford Mustang GT4. The move put both Sebastian and his father Andy in same team, as Multimatic handled both Ford's GT4 and WEC-based Ford GTE program. It also came amidst changing aspirations for Sebastian, whose focus turned to eventually competing in the 24 Hours of Le Mans as opposed to reaching Formula One. In the opening round of the season, Priaulx and Maxwell claimed a pair of pole positions, taking the GT4 class victory in the second event of the weekend at Oulton Park. The duo claimed another victory at Donington Park in June, and entered the final two rounds of the season at the top of the GT4 points classification. However, a ninth place finish at Brands Hatch saw Priaulx and Maxwell fall behind eventual championship winners Tom Canning and Ashley Hand, who had claimed a podium finish. A second-place result in the final round at Donington Park wasn't enough for the Multimatic team to claim the title, as they fell 7.5 points short of the aforementioned duo of Canning and Hand. 

Following the conclusion of the British GT season, Priaulx embarked upon his first race in North America, joining the team's Michelin Pilot Challenge entry alongside Austin Cindric for the final round of the season at Road Atlanta. Fortunate timing on a late race pit stop allowed the two to jump to the top of the Grand Sport classification, and Cindric drew out a three-second gap to the Automatic Racing entry of Tom Long and Akhil Rabindra to take the race victory.

Prior to the start of competition in 2020, Sebastian and Andy signed new long-term contracts with Multimatic; Sebastian as a driver and Andy in an advisory role. Sebastian's racing for the year took place stateside, as he once again paired with Austin Cindric for the opening race of the 2020 Michelin Pilot Challenge at Daytona. After racing resumed following a COVID-19-induced stoppage, Priaulx was confirmed to complete the season with Multimatic in the team's #22 entry, paired with several different co-drivers. Scott Maxwell joined Priaulx between the round at Road America and the October event at Road Atlanta, while Hailie Deegan and Marco Signoretti drove at the Laguna Seca and second Sebring rounds, respectively. Priaulx claimed a lone podium at Road Atlanta in September, finishing 11th in the Grand Sport class championship.

Porsche single-make and WEC
In a partnership between Kelly-Moss Road and Race and Multimatic Motorsports, Priaulx began competing in the new-for-2021 Porsche Carrera Cup North America in its inaugural season. In pre-season testing at Sebring, designed to shake down the new Porsche 992 GT3 Cup car, Priaulx registered the quickest time of the 19 entries that took part. A half-second behind him was his Kelly-Moss teammate Kay van Berlo, foreshadowing a year-long title fight between the two drivers. In the first race at Sebring, Priaulx edged out van Berlo to take the race victory, in the process becoming the series' first ever race winner. After winning the opening race of the season, van Berlo won five of the next seven, with Priaulx taking his second win of the season in the ninth race of the season. Priaulx's victory in race one at Indianapolis saw him climb to the top of the points standings for the first time since COTA. To end the season, Priaulx claimed victory in four of the final six races, taking the Pro-class championship with one race remaining. Alongside his championship victory, Priaulx was nominated to compete in the Porsche Junior Shootout, with the top prize being a fully-funded season in the 2022 Porsche Supercup. Ahead of the 2022 season, he was named as a BRDC Superstar, granting him financial support for the 2022 calendar year.

For 2022, Priaulx embarked on a full-season campaign in the FIA World Endurance Championship, competing with Dempsey-Proton Racing. He joined team principal Christian Ried and Multimatic driver Harry Tincknell in the LM GTE Am-class Porsche. Priaulx scored his first WEC victory at the second round of the championship at Spa, before adding another at Monza in July.

During 2022, Priaulx also undertook several one-off appearances in various championships. In January, he made his debut in the IMSA SportsCar Championship, competing in the 2022 24 Hours of Daytona with Sean Creech Motorsport. The team finished the event second in class, a lap behind the class-winning #74 entry of Riley Motorsports. In July, he joined Inception Racing by Optimum Motorsport's Gold Cup entry in the Spa 24 Hours, driving alongside Brendan Iribe, Ollie Millroy, and Frederik Schandorff. The group finished fourth in the Gold Cup classification, 27th overall. Priaulx returned to Inception Racing for Petit Le Mans, joining Iribe and Jordan Pepper in the GTD entry. The team led the class for 145 laps, but finished second after being held up at the pit exit during a late stop.

For the 2023 IMSA SportsCar Championship, Priaulx joined AO Racing Team for their full-season GTD class entry, driving alongside P. J. Hyett.

Racing record

Career summary

* Season still in progress.

Complete F4 British Championship results
(key) (Races in bold indicate pole position) (Races in italics indicate fastest lap)

Complete FIA World Endurance Championship results
(key) (Races in bold indicate pole position; races in italics indicate fastest lap)

Complete GT World Challenge Europe results

GT World Challenge Europe Endurance Cup

Complete IMSA SportsCar Championship results
(key) (Races in bold indicate pole position)

† Points only counted towards the Michelin Endurance Cup, and not the overall LMP3 Championship.

Complete 24 Hours of Le Mans results

References

External links
Sebastian Priaulx at the BRDC
Sebastian Priaulx at Autosport

2001 births
Living people
British racing drivers
Ginetta Junior Championship drivers
British F4 Championship drivers
FIA World Endurance Championship drivers
24 Hours of Le Mans drivers
Blancpain Endurance Series drivers
WeatherTech SportsCar Championship drivers
24 Hours of Daytona drivers
Arden International drivers
Multimatic Motorsports drivers
Sportspeople from Northampton
British GT Championship drivers
JHR Developments drivers
Michelin Pilot Challenge drivers